Holland Torpedo Boat Station is where the first United States Navy submarines were stationed for trials and training of submarine crews from 1899 to 1905. Holland Torpedo Boat Station was located in the community of Hamlet in New Suffolk, New York. Hamlet claims to be the first submarine base in the United States. The USS Holland was based at Hamlet's Holland Torpedo Boat Station from 1899 to 1905. Seven submarines built by the Holland Torpedo Boat Company – Electric Boat Company were stationed at Hamlet. Holland Torpedo Boat Station at Cutchogue Harbor was not designated a submarine base by the US Navy. The US Navy gave that title to Naval Submarine Base New London as the first submarine base. Naval Submarine Base New London was commissioned by the US Navy in 1916 as a dedicated submarine base.

History
The USS Holland was acquired by the Navy on 11 April 1900. On 16 October 1900, the USS Holland departed for her first port, United States Naval Academy at Annapolis, Maryland for crew training. USS Holland had a crew of one officer, and five enlisted men. Annapolis being a training center was not designated a US submarine base, though the USS Holland was stationed there. The Holland was built by Crescent Shipyard at Elizabeth, New Jersey for John Philip Holland. She was launched on 17 May 1897 and commissioned by the Navy on 12 October 1900 at Newport, Rhode Island.

Holland Torpedo Boat Station had engineers, mechanics, draftsmen, machine shops, housing and all the supplies needed to operate the seven submarines at Holland Torpedo Boat Station. A two-mile-long test track was made about three miles east of Holland Torpedo Boat Station in Little Peconic Bay. The two-mile test track was marked with buoys and flags. To test the submarine and train the crew, the submarine ran the course in both directions. On 26 July 1899 the USS Plunger followed the course submerged. Whitehead torpedo, the first self-propelled torpedo designed by Robert Whitehead was added to the submarine Holland at the Station on 20 August 1899 for training. On 6 November 1899, the first sea trails of the Holland were made. Rear admiral Frederick Rodgers and other US Navy personnel were at the first sea trails. Holland had seven crew members and two US Navy officers: Commander William H. Emory and Captain John Lowe (1838–1930) as observers for the Navy. In addition to the observers, three Whitehead torpedos were aboard. The test did electric runs (125V-175A), gas-powered runs, submerged runs, torpedo firings and torpedo reloading (Holland had one torpedo tube). Buoy with flags was added to the Holland so Frederick Rodgers and others could track the Holland during the submerged runs. The US Navy sea trial was successful and a report was given to the US Navy and US Congress. Later Captain John Lowe would report to the US Congress on 7 November 1899, the need for a fleet of submarines, as Philippines, Hawaii and other United States oversea territories could be attacked. Captain John Lowe became the first naval officer to be posted on active duty in the new US Navy submarine service. John Lowe retired in 1900 and in 1911 was promoted to rear admiral with a retroactive promotion back to 1900.

The Spanish American War broke out on 24 April 1898, new in warfare was the idea that a small vessel with a fast torpedo could sink a large ship. On 17 March 1898, the 55 feet long by 11 feet wide, Holland made its first sea trials at Perth Amboy, New Jersey before moving to Holland Torpedo Boat Station.

Station Submarines

USS Holland (SS-1), museum ship in 1913, scrapped 1932
USS Plunger (1895) was an experimental steam submarine, canceled April 1900 prior to completion, scrapped 1917
The six Plunger-class submarines, launched from 1901 to 1903, that were stationed and tested at Holland Torpedo Boat Station:
USS Plunger (SS-2) / A-1, scrapped 1922
USS Adder A-2, sunk as target 1920
USS Moccasin A-4, sunk as target 1921 
USS Porpoise A-6, sunk as target 1921 
USS Shark A-7, sunk as target 1921
Plunger-class submarines that were built and stationed in San Francisco, California:
USS Pike A-5, sunk as target 1921  
USS Grampus A-3, sunk as target 1921

Historical Marker
First Submarine Base Historical Marker reads:
This marks the site of the first submarine base in this country where "U.S.S. Holland", first submarine commissioned by the U.S. Navy was based for trials. In the period between 1899 and 1905 six other submarines of the Holland Torpedo Boat Co. were based at this site which was known as the Holland Torpedo Boat Station. Naval maneuvers between submarines and the U.S.S. torpedo boat destroyer "Winslow" of the Spanish War fame were held in these waters.
Erected by Cutchogue-New Suffolk Historical Council.
Located at Main Street at Cutchogue Harbor in Hamlet, New Suffolk, New York.

Gallery

See also

 Shore facility
 Submarine pen
 Submarines in the United States Navy
 List of submarine classes of the United States Navy
 Submarine Force Library and Museum
 Submarine squadron
 History of submarines

External links
youtube.com USS Holland 
youtube.com Submarine #1

References

United States Navy submarine bases
Naval Stations of the United States Navy
Closed installations of the United States Navy
Holland Torpedo Boat Station
John Philip Holland